Loren Kohnfelder is best known for his MIT S.B. (BSCSE) thesis written in May 1978 describing a practical means of applying public key cryptography to secure network communications.

The Kohnfelder thesis introduced the terms 'certificate' and 'certificate revocation list' as well as introducing numerous other concepts now established as important parts of public key infrastructure. The X.509 certificate specification that provides the basis for SSL, S/MIME and most modern PKI implementations are based on the Kohnfelder thesis.

He was also the co-creator, with Praerit Garg, of the STRIDE model of security threats, widely used in threat modeling.

In 2021 he published Designing Secure Software with No Starch Press. He maintains a medium blog.

References

External links 
  Kohnfelder, Loren M., Towards a Practical Public-Key Cryptosystem, May 1978.

Kohnfelder, Loren
Living people
Year of birth missing (living people)